George Weeks may refer to:
 George Weeks (priest) (1868–1941), English Anglican clergyman
 George Weeks (footballer) (1902–1982), English football full back
 George Weeks (politician) (1836–1905), member of the Wisconsin State Assembly
 George Weeks (American football) (1918–1980), American football defensive end

See also
 George Weekes (1869–1953), British academic